Guerra de ídolos (English title: Price of Fame) is an American telenovela created by Mariano Calasso for Telemundo. It is the first musical telenovela of Telemundo. It was recorded in Mexico.

The telenovela follows the story of the Solar family, and superstar Julio César Solar (Daniel Elbittar), an idol of Mexican Regional music.

The series stars Alberto Guerra as Mateo, María León as Manara, Daniel Elbittar as Julio César, Alejandro de la Madrid as Rafael, Juan Pablo Medina as Amado with the special performance of José María Torre as Isaac.

Plot 
Mateo Solar is the best composer and musical producer of the moment, both in the regional and urban genres. Member of a family of artists of Latin origin settled in Houston, he makes the "mistake" of falling in love with Manara; a singer whom they plan to release as a new pop star. But who brought Manara to him was Amado Matamoros, brother of Manara and Julia, trafficker of people and guns, who has controlled the lives of his sisters. Manara, unlike Julia, knows perfectly who is beloved, but keeps it secret to protect her sister, who is the light of his eyes and who has protected her since their mother died. The stormy relationship between Mateo and Manara goes against many interests, triggering ambitions and a war up and down the stages, which will extend from Los Angeles to Houston, and from Monterrey to Mexico City, exposing the most dark side of the world of music.

Mateo finds out that Matamoros had his brother and father killed, now the struggle starts when Mateo wants revenge for the death of his brother and father, while trying to protect Manara the love of his life.

Cast

Main 

 Alberto Guerra as Mateo Solar
 María León as Manara Matamoros
 Daniel Elbittar as Julio César Solar
 Alejandro de la Madrid as Rafael Zabala
 Juan Pablo Medina as Amado Matamoros
 José María Torre as Isaac Solar

 Erika de la Rosa as Selva Treviño
 Marco Treviño as Moisés Solar
 Fernando Cabrera as Ernesto Zabala
 Fabiola Campomanes as Itzel Paz
 Carmen Beato as Celestina Solar
 Vince Miranda as Valentín Vargas
 Alex Speitzer as Nicolás Zabala
 Claudio Lafarga as Lorenzo Treviño
 Sheryl Rubio as Julia Matamoros
 Sofía Lama as Gilda Solar
 Ximena Ayala as Agustina Osorio
 Adolfo Arias as Gabriel Treviño
 Viviana Serna as Belinda Guerrero
 Manuel Balbi as David
 Pedro Capó as Dylan Rodríguez
 Luis Figueroa as Diego Santillán
 Christian Pagán as Cristian León
 Alex Garza as Leticia Bravo
 Eduardo Tanus as Santiago Zabala
 Alex Brizuela as Bianco
 Juliana Galvis as La Davis

Recurring 

 Esteban Soberanes as Chalino Andrade
 Daniela Schmidt as Agustina Osorio
 Ricardo Esquerra as Fierro
 Pamela Almaza as Guillermina Sanders
 Fabián Pazzo as Básico
 Aarón Balderi as Lucho Lacalle
 Alejandro Marquina as Renzo Campos
 Tata Ariza as Gisela
 Evelyn Cedeño as Lila
 Patricia Bermúdez as Sabrina
 Edison Ruiz as Alexis Garza
 Maria Adelaida Puerta as Bárbara Montoya
 Ale Müller as Azul Montoya

Guest stars 
 Nicky Jam as Himself
 Zion & Lennox as Themselves
 Ozuna as himself

Production 
The series was presented in Telemundo's upfront for the 2016-2017 television season. Filming for the series began in 5 December 2016.

Reception 
The series premiered with the episode "Dos pájaros de un tiro" and "Venganza fallida" being watched by 1.03 and 1.12 million viewers respectively. The first ten episodes aired weekdays at 9pm/8c. Due to low ratings Telemundo moved Guerra de ídolos to Saturday's only at the same time of 9pm/8c. La querida del Centauro took over its original time slot.

Music 

The first soundtrack of the series, titled Guerra de ídolos, was released on April 17, 2017.

Track listing

Episodes

Awards and nominations

References

External links 
 

Telemundo telenovelas
Spanish-language American telenovelas
2017 telenovelas
2017 American television series debuts
Spanish-language Netflix original programming
2010s American LGBT-related drama television series
2017 American television series endings